In geometry, orbifold notation (or orbifold signature) is a system, invented by the mathematician William Thurston and promoted by John Conway, for representing types of symmetry groups in two-dimensional spaces of constant curvature.  The advantage of the notation is that it describes these groups in a way which indicates many of the groups' properties: in particular, it follows William Thurston in describing the orbifold obtained by taking the quotient of Euclidean space by the group under consideration.
 
Groups representable in this notation include the point groups on the sphere, the frieze groups and wallpaper groups of the Euclidean plane, and their analogues on the hyperbolic plane.

Definition of the notation 
The following types of Euclidean transformation can occur in a group described by orbifold notation:

 reflection through a line (or plane)
 translation by a vector
 rotation of finite order around a point
 infinite rotation around a line in 3-space
 glide-reflection, i.e. reflection followed by translation.

All translations which occur are assumed to form a discrete subgroup of the group symmetries being described.

Each group is denoted in orbifold notation by a finite string made up from the following symbols:

 positive integers 
 the infinity symbol, 
 the asterisk, *
 the symbol o (a solid circle in older documents), which is called a wonder and also a handle because it topologically represents a torus (1-handle) closed surface. Patterns repeat by two translation.
 the symbol  (an open circle in older documents), which is called a miracle and represents a topological crosscap where a pattern repeats as a mirror image without crossing a mirror line.

A string written in boldface represents a group of symmetries of Euclidean 3-space. A string not written in boldface represents a group of symmetries of the Euclidean plane, which is assumed to contain two independent translations.

Each symbol corresponds to a distinct transformation:

 an integer n to the left of an asterisk indicates a rotation of order n around a gyration point
 an integer n to the right of an asterisk indicates a transformation of order 2n which rotates around a kaleidoscopic point and reflects through a line (or plane)
 an  indicates a glide reflection
 the symbol  indicates infinite rotational symmetry around a line; it can only occur for bold face groups. By abuse of language, we might say that such a group is a subgroup of symmetries of the Euclidean plane with only one independent translation. The frieze groups occur in this way.
 the exceptional symbol o indicates that there are precisely two linearly independent translations.

Good orbifolds 

An orbifold symbol is called good if it is not one of the following: p, pq, *p, *pq, for p, q ≥ 2, and p ≠ q.

Chirality and achirality 
An object is chiral if its symmetry group contains no reflections; otherwise it is called achiral. The corresponding orbifold is orientable in the chiral case and non-orientable otherwise.

The Euler characteristic and the order
The Euler characteristic of an orbifold can be read from its Conway symbol, as follows.  Each feature has a value:

 n without or before an asterisk counts as 
 n after an asterisk counts as 
 asterisk and  count as 1
 o counts as 2.

Subtracting the sum of these values from 2 gives the Euler characteristic.

If the sum of the feature values is 2, the order is infinite, i.e., the notation represents a wallpaper group or a frieze group.   Indeed, Conway's "Magic Theorem" indicates that the 17 wallpaper groups are exactly those with the sum of the feature values equal to 2.  Otherwise, the order is 2 divided by the Euler characteristic.

Equal groups
The following groups are isomorphic:
1* and *11
22 and 221
*22 and *221
2* and 2*1.
This is because 1-fold rotation is the "empty" rotation.

Two-dimensional groups

The symmetry of a 2D object without translational symmetry can be described by the 3D symmetry type by adding a third dimension to the object which does not add or spoil symmetry. For example, for a 2D image we can consider a piece of carton with that image displayed on one side; the shape of the carton should be such that it does not spoil the symmetry, or it can be imagined to be infinite. Thus we have n• and *n•. The bullet (•) is added on one- and two-dimensional groups to imply the existence of a fixed point. (In three dimensions these groups exist in an n-fold digonal orbifold and are represented as nn and *nn.)

Similarly, a 1D image can be drawn horizontally on a piece of carton, with a provision to avoid additional symmetry with respect to the line of the image, e.g. by drawing a horizontal bar under the image. Thus the discrete symmetry groups in one dimension are *•, *1•, ∞• and *∞•.

Another way of constructing a 3D object from a 1D or 2D object for describing  the symmetry is taking the Cartesian product of the object and an asymmetric 2D or 1D object, respectively.

Correspondence tables

Spherical

Euclidean plane

Frieze groups

Wallpaper groups

Hyperbolic plane 

A first few hyperbolic groups, ordered by their Euler characteristic are:

See also 
Mutation of orbifolds
 Fibrifold notation - an extension of orbifold notation for 3d space groups

References

 John H. Conway, Olaf Delgado Friedrichs, Daniel H. Huson, and William P. Thurston. On Three-dimensional Orbifolds and Space Groups. Contributions to Algebra and Geometry, 42(2):475-507, 2001.
 J. H. Conway, D. H. Huson. The Orbifold Notation for Two-Dimensional Groups. Structural Chemistry, 13 (3-4): 247–257, August 2002.
 J. H. Conway (1992). "The Orbifold Notation for Surface Groups". In: M. W. Liebeck and J. Saxl (eds.), Groups, Combinatorics and Geometry, Proceedings of the L.M.S. Durham Symposium, July 5–15, Durham, UK, 1990; London Math. Soc. Lecture Notes Series 165. Cambridge University Press, Cambridge. pp. 438–447
 John H. Conway, Heidi Burgiel, Chaim Goodman-Strauss, The Symmetries of Things 2008,

External links
 A field guide to the orbifolds (Notes from class on "Geometry and the Imagination" in Minneapolis, with John Conway, Peter Doyle, Jane Gilman and Bill Thurston, on June 17–28, 1991. See also PDF, 2006)
 Tegula Software for visualizing two-dimensional tilings of the plane, sphere and hyperbolic plane, and editing their symmetry groups in orbifold notation

Group theory
Generalized manifolds
Mathematical notation
John Horton Conway